Qingshui County is a county in Gansu province of the People's Republic of China, bordering Shaanxi province to the east. It is under the administration of the prefecture-level city of Tianshui. In 2014 its population was 324,300 people, of which 298,800 was rural.

The county administers 6 towns, 12 townships, 260 administrative villages, and 1118 villager groups.

The area has been inhabited since prehistoric times with over 190 archaeological sites having been uncovered. In 115 B.C. a county called Shangju (上邽) was established in current Qingshui. It is the birthplace of Zhao Chongguo (赵充国), a famous Han dynasty general. According to some historians, Genghis Khan died in what is now Qingshui.

Qingshui has some of the most fertile agricultural lands in the region. Crops that are grown include wheat, corn, artichokes, beans, as well as economic crops such as Chinese medicinal plants, flax, sunflower, hemp, vegetables, and flowers.

Administrative divisions
Qingshui County is divided to 15 towns, 3 townships and 1 other.
Towns

Townships
 Jiachuan Township()
 Fengwang Township()
 Xincheng Township()

Others
 Qingshui County Science and Technology Breeding Demonstration Park

Climate

See also
 List of administrative divisions of Gansu

References

 
Qingshui County
Tianshui